Mahmoud Ladjili (born 18 February 1946) is a Tunisian boxer. He competed in the men's bantamweight event at the 1968 Summer Olympics.

References

1946 births
Living people
Tunisian male boxers
Olympic boxers of Tunisia
Boxers at the 1968 Summer Olympics
Sportspeople from Tunis
Mediterranean Games bronze medalists for Tunisia
Mediterranean Games medalists in boxing
Competitors at the 1967 Mediterranean Games
Bantamweight boxers
21st-century Tunisian people
20th-century Tunisian people